Pierre Debray-Ritzen (27 February 1922 – 7 July 1993) was a French psychiatrist.

He was a member of the Club de l'horloge.

Publications 
 L'Odeur du temps, roman, Casterman, 1963
 Le Défi aux étoiles, Plon, 1964
 Les Nervures de l'être : éléments d'une psychologie de la littérature, Rencontre, 1967
 La Dyslexie de l'enfant : origine, dépistage, mesure, rééducation, Casterman, 1970
 Un final vénitien, Fayard, 1971
 Génétique et Psychiatrie, Fayard, 1972
 Les Troubles du comportement de l'enfant, Fayard, 1973 (with Badrig Mélékian)
 La Scolastique freudienne, Fayard, 1973
 Psychologie de la littérature et de la création littéraire, Retz, 1977
 Lettre ouverte aux parents des petits écoliers, Albin Michel, 1978
 Psychologie de la création : de l'art des parfums à l'art littéraire, Albin Michel, 1979
 L'Usure de l'âme, mémoires, Albin Michel, 1980
 Les Cahiers de Tycho de Leyde artiste peintre, 1649-1702, Albin Michel, 1982
 Corot, éd. de Vergeures, collection « À l'école des grands peintres », 1982
 Ce que je crois, Grasset, 1983
 Conversations dans l'univers, Albin Michel, 1986 (with André Brahic)
 Arthur Koestler. Un croisé sans croix, L’Herne, 1987
 Jusqu’à la corde, mémoires, Albin Michel, 1989
 Georges Simenon, romancier de l'instinct, Favre, 1989
 La Mort en moi, roman, L’Âge d’Homme, 1990
 La Psychanalyse, cette imposture, Albin Michel, 1991
 Claude Bernard ou un nouvel état de l'humaine raison, Albin Michel, 1992

References 

1922 births
1993 deaths
20th-century French non-fiction writers
French psychiatrists
French medical writers
Writers from Paris
Carrefour de l'horloge people
20th-century French physicians
Winners of the Prix Broquette-Gonin (literature)
20th-century French male writers
French male non-fiction writers